Periodic tryptophan protein 1 homolog is a protein that in humans is encoded by the PWP1 gene.

References

Further reading